Nelson César Brizuela Ojeda (born 10 January 1950) is a football player and coach.

External links
 
NASL career stats

Living people
1950 births
Paraguayan footballers
Association football forwards
Club Guaraní players
Paraguayan football managers
Parramatta FC managers
Municipal Limeño managers
C.D. FAS managers
C.D. Luis Ángel Firpo managers
L.D.U. Loja managers
Delfín S.C. managers
Paraguayan expatriate footballers
Paraguayan expatriate sportspeople in El Salvador
Expatriate football managers in El Salvador